"Heaven" is a song by Scottish band the Chimes, released on 20 November 1989 as the second single from their only album, The Chimes (1990). It reached number one on the US Billboard Hot Dance Club Play chart, staying at the top for one week. The song also peaked at number 54 on the Billboard Hot Black Singles chart, but failed to appear on the Billboard Hot 100. "Heaven" also reached number 24 on the UK Singles Chart and number five in New Zealand.

Critical reception 
Bill Coleman of Billboard complimented the song as "tasty" and "an even stronger club offering", than the band's debut single, "1-2-3". He felt that vocalist Pauline Henry's delivery "sends shivers and has been called by one colleague "the Candi Staton of the '90's"." Paul Lester from Melody Maker declared the song as "brilliant", adding that "Heaven" "should give the Chimes their second visit to Top of the Pops". Music & Media wrote that this self-produced and self written soul number has a house rhythm track and an "excellent" vocal performance. The reviewer added, "The record sparkles with gospel energy and the inclusion of an unexpectedly messy piano is great. Give it a play." When re-released in 1990, the magazine stated that "following up their massive "I Still Haven't Found...", this electryfing act brings us more house-pulsed dance. Soulful vocals and a rocking piano riff." Nick Robinson from Music Week commented on the re-release, "This time the funky drum, subtle piano and wailing vocal track should make a sizeable dent in the pop chart, building on the success of "Still Haven't Found.." earlier this year." 

Helen Mead from NME complimented its "stomping smash and grab", declaring it as "a track that couldn't have been any more perfect for the club climate if they'd got Adamski in on keyboards." Daniele Davoli of Black Box reviewed "Heaven" for Number One, saying, "It's really nice. It seems to be like a true sound — when you close your eyes you see the song in the same way. It's not a refined song but it's full of feeling and that's the stuff I like. They're going to have a heavy success." Miranda Sawyer from Smash Hits noted Henry's "remarkable voice", declaring the track as "classy". Steven Daly from Spin concluded, "1990 won't yield many records better than the Chimes' go-for-broke paean to sexual congress "Heaven"..."

Track listing

Charts

References

1989 singles
1989 songs
The Chimes (Scottish band) songs
Songs written by Mike Peden